The Kjeungskjær Lighthouse is a coastal lighthouse in the municipality of Ørland in Trøndelag county, Norway.

Description
The lighthouse was built in 1880 and automated in 1987. Prior to being automated, the lighthouse keeper and his family lived on the lower floors of the building.

The white, red, or green light (depending on direction), occulting once every 6 seconds. There is a fresnel lens that has been in use since 1906. The lighthouse is lit every year from July 21 until May 16. It is dark during the late spring and early summer months due to the midnight sun.

Kjeungskjær Lighthouse Gallery

See also

Lighthouses in Norway
List of lighthouses in Norway

References

External links
 Norsk Fyrhistorisk Forening 
 Video of Kjeungskjær fyr
 

Lighthouses completed in 1880
Ørland
Lighthouses in Trøndelag